Aberdeen Historic District in Aberdeen, South Dakota is a  historic district that was listed on the National Register of Historic Places in 1975.
It includes three whole blocks and 13 partial blocks.

It includes part of Hagerty and Lloyd Historic District.  It includes 62 contributing buildings, mostly residences but also six churches, five businesses, a public library, a public school and a private school.  These include works by E.W. Van Meter, George Fossum, and Ursa Louis Freed, and includes Colonial Revival, Italianate, and Queen Anne architecture.

The Aberdeen Highlands Historic District and the Aberdeen Commercial Historic District, in the same town, are also NRHP-listed.

References

Historic districts on the National Register of Historic Places in South Dakota
Queen Anne architecture in South Dakota
Italianate architecture in South Dakota
Colonial Revival architecture in South Dakota
Geography of Brown County, South Dakota
National Register of Historic Places in Brown County, South Dakota
Protected areas established in 1975
Buildings and structures in Aberdeen, South Dakota